Roland Sands (born August 12, 1974) is an American motorcycle racer and designer of custom high-performance motorcycles. In his career as a professional motorcycle racer, he has won the 1998 AMA 250GP National Champion road racer championship. Sands is a designer of custom performance motorcycles, and owner and founder of Roland Sands Design.

Background 

Sands is from Long Beach, California. He began his life with the upbringing and diverse experience in the motorcycle industry. His first motorcycle was a Suzuki RM 50 dirt bike, given to him on his 5th birthday, on which, after just minutes of riding, he broke a bone, but fell in love with it anyway. He literally grew up in the Performance Machine shop, and started working there at age 14 sweeping floors. Quickly moving up to assembly, sanding polishing, wheel designing, eventually working his way as Director of R&D and Design at Performance Machine. In 2005, after the tremendous success Sands found on Discovery Channel's Biker Build-Off vs. Arlen Ness, Sands founded Roland Sands Design. RSD designs concept motorcycle parts and accessories and builds custom motorcycles. RSD works with major motorcycle manufacturers to design concept and prototype motorcycles and promote benchmark product in the motorcycle industry and beyond. Sands’ designs are described as being a mixture of sport bike and chopper influences to create the ultimate custom bikes.

Pro racing career 
During Sands’ professional racing career, from 1994 to 2002, Sands gained 10 wins to his reputation. At the age of 19, Sands’ father sent him to Keith Code’s California Superbike School, and from that day on, road racing became his passion. His first race bike was a Yamaha TZ250, a purpose-built, two stroke racing machine. Winning his first novice 250GP race at Willow Springs Raceway in California, Sands enjoyed a nine-year professional racing career at the top of the AMA 250GP ranks, including a national championship in 1998. In 2000, after winning a few races stateside, Sands did a stint in the British Super Cup series on a factory Honda. Sands still currently holds four track records including Daytona, Sears Point, and Mazda Raceway Laguna Seca. Although enjoying his racing career, bodily injuries caused by racing accidents were taking the best of his competitive drive. Sands decided to broaden his career in custom motorcycle design and building, in which he had already mechanical and fabrication skills from building race bikes during his racing years.

In 2004, designer Chip Foose awarded Sands with the Award of Design Excellence for his design on the motorcycle 'The Hard Way'. In 2005, he was honored by his peers, who voted him Rookie of the Year on the Discovery Channel Biker Build-Off award show. Since his first television appearance on Biker Build-Off, he’s been featured on ESPN2’s Chopper Nation and Super Bikes, Speed Channel's American Thunder and Build or Bust, and crowned champion of Biker Build-Off in 2006 against Jesse Rooke.

Awards and accomplishments 

 AMA 250 GP Champion 1998
 V-Twin Wheel Design of the Year 2002
 V-Twin Control Design of the Year 2004
 V-Twin Wheel Design of the Year 2004
 Chip Foose Design of Excellence Award, Sturgis, 2004
 Modified Harley Class at the World Championship of Custom Bike Building 2nd, 3rd, and 4th place in 2005
 V-Twin Award Trendsetter of the Year, Daytona, 2005
 Discovery Channel’s Ultimate Chop Biker Build-Off Season Finale and Awards Ceremony Rookie of the Year 2005
 V-Twin Award Trendsetter of the year, Daytona, 2005
 Discovery Channel’s Biker Build-Off Champion for Sands vs. Rooke episode 1, 2006

Press and publicity

Covers 
 Xtreme Bikes (Spain), Issue No. 20
 Freeway Magazine (France), May 2005
　Hardcore Chopper(Japan),November 2005
 Sport Bike (United States), 2006 Issue
 Wild Motorcycles (France), June 2006
 Barnett’s (United States), September 2006
 Bike Works (United States), September 2006
 Xtreme Bike (Spain), Issue No. 22
 Superstreet Bikes (United States), October 2006
 Performance Bikes (UK[), October 2006
 American Iron (United States), September 2011

Articles 

 Hot Rod Bikes (United States) Feb. 2003: The Racer’s Edge: Roland Sand’s Builds his First American Custom
 Freeway Magazine (France) Feb. 2003 Rolling with the Homies: V-Rod Motorcycle Performance Machine’s Roland Sands Designs Whiskey Tang No. 10  Team PM Family Affair: Perry and Roland
 V-Twin Motorcycles (United States) Sept. 2003 Performance Machine Master Builder Triple Threat Talents
 Wild Motorcycles (France) April 2004 The Hard Way 70 : PM raises the bar with Roland’s new V-ROD Like Father, Like Son: Perry and Roland Sands Interview
 Hot Bike 2005 Calendar January: The Hard Way 70
 Freeway Magazine (France) May 2005: Daytona Hard Rock El Grande Moco from Sands
 Orange County Register – Sept. 2005: Architect in Motion
 Barnett’s (United States) Aug./Sept 2005 Laughlin River Run: El Grande Moco
 Harley Davidson’s Dream Machine (Germany) Sept. 2005: Performance Machine’s Roland Sands #35 V-Rod and Street Rod Specials
 Robb Report Motorcycling (United States) Nov./Dec. 2005 Green Machine: Roland Sands builds for both style and Substance the Grande Moco
 Xtreme Bikes (Spain) No. 20 Roland Sands’ The Glory Stomper
 Playboy Magazine (United States) March 2006 On the Scene: Custom official Roland Sands is fueling next generation of custom motorcycles
 Biker Journalen (Norway) No. 3 2006 Roland Sands Biker Build-Off: The Glory Stomper
 McNytt (Denmark) May 2006 Back to Nature: RSD’s the Grunt
 Cycle News (United States) Issue #19 May 17, 2006 Build or Bust: Roland Sands’ No Regrets
 Wild Motorcycles (France) June 2006 Wild Wheels: RSD’s Grunt
 Easyriders (United States) 35th Anniversary Special June 2006 Something Different from Roland Sands: The Art of Function, the Glory Stomper
 Motociclismo (Spain) Aug. 2006 El Grande Moco
 Cycle News (United States) August 9, 2006: Sands Gets His Hands on MotoGP Engine…Watch Out!
 Freeway (France) Aug. 2006: The Roland Sands Story: Street Warrior Grunt, the RSD Grunt Roland Sands Performance Superboy The Glory Stomper El Burracho Sport Bike (United States) 2006 Issue: Roland Sands’ New Blood HayabUnited States ‘BUnited States’s baby! Speed Dating: A ‘BUnited States and Bunny Tale MotorRad (Germany) August 18, 2006: Intro News: RSD KRV5 Tracker Wild Magazine (France) Sept. 2006: RSD’s KRV5 Tracker RSD’s No Regrets V-Twin News (United States) Sept. 2006: RSD Vintage Cover Line Performance Bike (Japan) Performance Machine PM’s Roland Sands Bike Works (United States) Sept. 2006: Biker Build Off Race: Roland Sands vs. Jesse Rooke Roland Sands vs. Jesse Rooke at Willow Springs Raceway Barnett’s (United States) Sept. 2006 Roland Sands Interview Super Street Bike (United States) Oct. 2006: Biker Build-Off Winner: Roland Sands New World Order Performance Bikes (UK) Oct. 2006: Roland Sands’ Radical 2-litre Harley Racer  U.S. Bike-building Genius Injects some West Coast attitude into Goodwood: No Regrets Hot Bike (United States) Vol. 38 No. 12 Oct. 24, 2006 Custom Looks, Reliability, and Good Manners: Roland Sands comes up another winner ‘The Vintage Kit’''

Television appearances 

 Discovery Channel's Biker Build-Off : Chop Off finale September 4, 2006
 Discovery Channel's Biker Build-Off : two episodes, 2005
 ESPN2’s SuperBikes : one episode, 2006
 ESPN2’s Chopper Nation : two episodes, 2005
 Speed Channel's American Thunder : ten episodes, 2004, 2005, 2006
 Speed Channel's Build or Bust : three episodes, 2005
 MTV's Nitro Circus : One Episode, 2009
 Esquire Network's Wrench Against the Machine: Judge for Season 1 (Episodes 1 through 5 {5 of 5}) 2016, 2017

Retail Expansion 
July 2021 Roland Sands Design (RSD) moved their retail store to Long Beach, CA.  On display is a beautiful collection of RSD Customized motorcycles, with leather gear, parts and accessories for sale.  Store hours are Monday through Friday 9am - 6pm, Saturdays 9am- 5pm.

The retail store is located at: 1365 Obispo Ave, Long Beach, CA 90804

References

External links 
 Roland Sands Design Main Website
 Performance Machine
 Roland Sands Design talks with us about his brand and more

Sources 
 Hot Bike Magazine
 Motorcycle USA Magazine
 Bikernet.com
 Livingwithgravity.com

Roland Sands brings the high-quality motorcycle Johnny Jacket

1974 births
Living people
Sportspeople from Long Beach, California
Motorcycle builders
American motorcycle racers